Beddomeia capensis is an aquatic operculate gastropod mollusk, a species of very small freshwater snail that has a gill and an operculum, in the family Hydrobiidae. The species is classified as endangered and known to be endemic to five streams within a relatively small area on the island state of Tasmania, Australia.

Description
B. capensis are small (1–7 mm) and difficult to identify to a species level in the field, being distinguished by a number of shell and anatomical characters. Their conical-shaped shells can be opaque to dark brown in colour. The shells are most often smooth, but may possess faint sculpturing. The shell is 2.21-2.71 mm long,  1.38-1.71 mm wide, with a protoconch of about 1.67 whorls.

The species is not sexually dimorphic in length, width or shape, the principal characters used to separate species of Beddomeia are the male and female reproductive systems, which require microscopic dissection of specimens.

Population and habitat
B. capensis is known from two small streams on Table Cape, where they are located on and under stones, leaves and wood where it feeds actively, grazing on periphyton. Field observations indicate these snails have a preference for the underside and lower margins of rocks and stream debris.

Threats

Habitat disturbance
The principal identified threats to freshwater molluscs are agricultural clearing, forestry, mining and impoundment construction. As the species is confined to small order streams, it is consequently at a higher risk of being impacted by habitat degradation and modification due to agricultural land practises. The two remaining sites where the species is known to occur are on remnant native riparian vegetation within cleared agricultural land. The loss of species at three previously recorded sites, is likely due to intensively modified stream channels resulting in loss of habitat and competition.

Interspecific competition
Owing to the restricted subpopulations of B. capensis, they are considered vulnerable to interspecific competition and displacement from the exotic P. antipodarum (New Zealand mud snail), as they occur in areas already subjected to water quality degradation which is favoured by the exotic species.

Stochastic risk
The fragmented distribution of the subpopulations of B. capensis offer no opportunity for genetic exchange between subpopulations, thus exposing the species to a risk of extinction.

See also

List of non-marine molluscs of Australia
Threatened fauna of Australia

References

External links

Gastropods of Australia
Hydrobiidae
Beddomeia
Endangered fauna of Australia
Endemic fauna of Australia
Gastropods described in 1993
Taxonomy articles created by Polbot